Vincent Joseph Murphy (August 1, 1893 – June 8, 1976) was an  American labor leader and Democratic Party politician from New Jersey. He was Mayor of Newark, New Jersey from 1941 to 1949 and the Democratic nominee for Governor of New Jersey in 1943.

Biography
Murphy was born on August 1, 1893 in Newark, New Jersey the second eldest of 10 children of Thomas Francis Murphy and Sarah Gaskin. At the age of 15 he became a plumber's apprentice. He joined the Local 24 of the United Association in 1913, serving as the secretary-treasurer from 1920 to 1938. He was named secretary-treasurer of the state American Federation of Labor in 1933.

Murphy first entered politics in 1937, competing for a seat on the five-man Newark City Commission with 49 other candidates. Though he bested the field, he was denied the position of Mayor (traditionally awarded to the highest vote-getter) because of the opposition of Democratic political boss Frank Hague. In 1941 he again outpolled all other candidates, and with the support of Hague was named Mayor of Newark by his fellow City Commissioners.

In 1943 Murphy ran as the Democratic candidate for  Governor of New Jersey against Republican Walter Evans Edge, who had come out of retirement after serving as United States Senator and United States Ambassador to France, as well as Governor during World War I. Edge warned that a Democratic victory would lead to domination of "labor leaders, communists and Hagueism." Murphy was defeated by Edge by a margin of 127,000 votes.

Murphy was reelected as Mayor of Newark in 1945, but he was defeated in 1949, in a year when the Hague machine was overturned after 32 years of domination. He did not seek political office after the 1949 defeat, returning to his role in labor leadership. When the New Jersey AFL put aside its rivalry with the CIO in 1961, Murphy was named president of the newly formed New Jersey AFL-CIO. He served in this position until his retirement in 1970.

In 1976 Murphy died at his home in Spring Lake, New Jersey at the age of 83.

References

External links
Vincent J. Murphy entry at The Political Graveyard

1893 births
1976 deaths
American trade union leaders
Mayors of Newark, New Jersey
New Jersey Democrats
People from Spring Lake, New Jersey
20th-century American politicians